Olivier Prechac (5 January 1949 – 12 January 2007) was a French ice hockey player. He competed in the men's tournament at the 1968 Winter Olympics.

References

External links
 

1949 births
2007 deaths
Olympic ice hockey players of France
Ice hockey players at the 1968 Winter Olympics
Sportspeople from Versailles, Yvelines